The National Infrastructure Agency ANI, is a Colombian government agency, part of the Ministry of Transport, in charge of concessions through public–private partnerships, for the design, construction, maintenance, operation, and administration of the transport infrastructure in Colombia.

References

Government agencies established in 2011
Ministry of Transport (Colombia)
Infrastructure in Colombia